Chi Octantis, Latinized from χ Octantis, is a solitary star located in the southern circumpolar constellation Octans. It is faintly visible to the naked eye as an orange-hued star with an apparent magnitude of 5.28. The object is located relatively close at a distance of 261 light years based on Gaia EDR3 parallax measurements, but it is receding with a heliocentric radial velocity . At its current distance, Chi Octantis' brightness is diminished by 0.24 magnitudes due to interstellar dust. It has an absolute magnitude of +0.81.

Chi Octantis is an evolved red giant with a stellar classification of K3 III. It has 125% the mass of the Sun and an enlarged radius of  due to its evolved state. It radiates 73.6 times the luminosity of the Sun from its photosphere at an effective temperature of 4,266 K. Chi Octantis is metal enriched with an iron abundance 126% that of the Sun ([Fe/H] = +0.10) and spins slowly with a projected rotational velocity less than 1 km/s−1.

References

Octans
K-type giants
Octantis, Chi
Octantis, 30
CD-87 00092
164461
092824
6721